Bradina diagonalis is a moth of the family Crambidae described by Achille Guenée in 1854. It was described from Java, but is also found in Taiwan, China, Vietnam and Pakistan.

References

Moths described in 1854
Bradina